A seeding agency is a social media advertising agency which places branded films on websites, messageboards and online communities that are heavily frequented by users. Usually a client pays a seeding agency per pageview or hit.

See also 
The Viral Factory

References 

Advertising agencies